William Barford (died November 1792) was an English scholar and Anglican clergyman.

Life
Barford was educated at Eton College, and elected to King's College, Cambridge in 1737. He proceeded B.A. in 1742, M.A. in 1746, and D.D. in 1771. He became tutor of his college, was thrice moderator in the Sophs' school, was proctor in 1761, and from 1762 to 1768 Public Orator, only resigning the post to stand for the Greek professorship, which he failed to obtain. In 1768, his college presented him with the living of Fordingbridge, in Hampshire, and in the year following he was appointed Chaplain to the Speaker of the House of Commons by Sir John Cust, the then speaker, but held the office for only one session. The next speaker appointed another chaplain, and Barford's friends feared he would be deprived of the usual preferment conferred on holders of the office; but on the plea that he was to be considered chaplain, appointed not by the speaker but by the house, it was resolved, 9 May 1770, that the king be addressed to confer some dignity upon him. He was consequently installed a prebendary of Canterbury in June of the same year. In 1773 he resigned Fordingbridge for the rectory of Kimpton, Hertfordshire, which he held along with the living of Allhallows, Lombard Street, till his death in November 1792. He married in 1764.

Dr. Jacob Bryant, in the preface to the third volume of his New System of Mythology, pays a high tribute to Barford's talents and erudition, thanking him for his 'zeal,’ his 'assistance,’ and his 'judicious remarks.' In the life of Bryant, prefixed to the six-volume edition of the New System, Barford is put first in the list of his friends.

Works
A Latin dissertation of Barford's on the 'First Pythian' is published in Henry Huntingford's edition of Pindar's works, to which is appended a short life of the author, a list of his works, and a eulogium of his learning. The list consists of poems on various political events in Latin and Greek, written in his capacity of public orator, a Latin oration at the funeral of William George, provost of King's College, 1756, and a Concio ad Clerum, 1784, written after his installation as canon of Canterbury.

References

Year of birth missing
1792 deaths
18th-century births
18th-century English educators
People educated at Eton College
Alumni of King's College, Cambridge
English Christian religious leaders
18th-century scholars
English chaplains
Cambridge University Orators